Raphitoma garlandi is an extinct species of sea snail, a marine gastropod mollusc in the family Raphitomidae.

Description

Distribution
Fossils of this extinct marine species were found in Pliocene strata in Suffolk, GB

References

 Harmer, F. W. "IV. The Stratigraphical Position of the Coralline Crag." Geological Magazine 5.9 (1918): 409–412.

garlandi
Gastropods described in 1918